Jennifer Ann Tetrick (born November 15, 1981) is an American professional racing cyclist, who last rode for UCI Women's Team .

Major results
2015
3rd Individual Pursuit, Grand Prix of Colorado Springs
3rd Individual Pursuit, U.S. Vic Williams Memorial Grand Prix

See also
 List of 2016 UCI Women's Teams and riders

References

External links
 

1981 births
Living people
American female cyclists
People from Los Angeles County, California
21st-century American women